Tricula montana is a species of freshwater snail with a gill and an operculum, an aquatic gastropod mollusk in the family Pomatiopsidae.

Tricula montana is the type species of the genus Tricula.

Distribution 
The distribution of Tricula montana includes Assam, Uttarakhand in India, and Nepal.

Ecology 
This freshwater snail lives in springs, streams and small rivers.

References 

Pomatiopsidae
Gastropods described in 1843
Taxa named by William Henry Benson
Taxonomy articles created by Polbot